Bride of Silence (Hạt mưa rơi bao lâu) is a 2005 Vietnamese film directed by Đoàn Minh Phượng and Doàn Thanh Nghia which played at several overseas film festivals including the 2006 Bangkok International Film Festival. starring Trương Ngọc Ánh. It won the award for Best ASEAN film in 2006.

References

2005 films
Vietnamese-language films
Vietnamese drama films